Kaskaskia Precinct is located in Randolph County, Illinois, USA.  As of the 2010 census, its population was 47. This precinct is separated from the rest of Randolph County (and the rest of Illinois) by the Mississippi River.

Geography

References

Precincts in Randolph County, Illinois